Praveen D Rao is an Indian musician, music director and a lyricist for Kannada language songs. He is based in Bangalore, India. He plays keyboard, tabla and others.

Early life 
He was trained by Pt. R. V. Sheshadri Gawai of Aravinda Sangeetha Vidyalaya and Tabla Maestro Pandit Ravindra Yavagal. Rao has composed music for theatre works, ballets, films, television and commercials.

Music direction

Serials

Films

Original scores for dance and physical theatre productions

Midlands Art Centre, U.K.   
 PRINCESS AUBERGINE (1995)

Chitraleka Dance Company, U.K.
 PANCHATANTRA (1994), 
 KAISHIKI (1995),
 RAMAYANA (1996),
 CONFERENCE OF BIRDS (2002)
  
Smt. Indira Thiagarajah, London.
 BIMBA PRATIBIMBA (1993)
 
Abhinava Dance Company, Bangalore.
 DATTA MAHIMA
 DWADASHATMA (1994), 
 SPIRIT OF DANCE (1995), 
 MANINI (1995), 
 SAMARPAN SWEEKAR (1998),
 SAATH SAAT (2000),
 SHRINGAR RAAM (2001),
 PREM SHANTHI (2002),
 NIGAH (2003),
 TA DHA (2004), 
 MUSHTI (2005),
 TAD BHARATHAM (2019)

Monica, Belgium.
 PATANJALI YOGA SUTRA (2000), 
 MEERA (2003)

Smt. Radha Sridhar, Bangalore.
 MEGHADOOTHA (1999)

Prabhath International, Bangalore.
 SRINIVASA KALYANA (2000)
 SHILA BAALIKA (2001), 
 FLUTE FANTASY (2001), 
 PISCEAN PASSION (2002)

Prabhat Kalavidaru, Bangalore.
 CINDERELLA,
 KARUNAMAYA SHIVA

Nadam Academy of Performing Arts.  
 ANTARDHWANI

Rasika Dance Academy.
 YATRA, 
 DEVANGA MAHIMA
 
Smt. Piali Ray, U. K. 
 SHYAMA (1993) - Rabindranath Tagore's Musical
 
SAMPAD YUVA, U. K. 
 A BREATH OF LIFE,
 INEQUALITY (1993)

Smt. M. P. Suma, Bangalore.
 OMKAARA,
 VIJAYA KALYANA, 
 VACHANA VYBHAVA
  
STEM contemporary dance theatre, Bangalore  
 CROWS - CAWS – FACADES (1995)

Gig Payne, U.K.
 CONVERSATIONS - PERFORMING ABILITIES OF THE MULTIPLE DISABLED (1994)

PAMPA, U.S.A.  
 PRAKRITI (2004)

Sandesha, Mangalore. 
 LIFE OF JESUS (2002),
 JYOTHIRGAMAYA (2003)

Smt. Padmini Ravi, Bangalore.  
 TAMTANA (2004)

ISKCON, Bangalore.
 CHAITANYA MAHAPRABHU (2004)

Smt. Supriya Desai, U.S.A.   
 MAHISHASURA MARDINI, 
 SRI KRISHNA PARIJATHA (2003)

Smt. Maya Rao, Natya Institute of Kathak and Choreography, Bangalore.   
 YASHODARA (2004), 
 THE DUST OF BRIJ (2003) 
 SARE JAHAN SE ACCHA (July 2005)

Pushpanjali, Manchester.
 SNOW WHITE(2004),
 RAMAYANA (July 2005)

Ramakrishna Vidyashala, Mysore.
 NRITYA SANGEETH BHARATHI (2004), 
 SARVA DHARMA SAMANVAYACHARYA SRI RAMAKRISHNA (2004)

Guy Hutchins, Moby Duck Theatre Company, U.K.
 MAZE MAKER (Mar 2004),
 BOPOLUCHI (Nov 2004),
 FIRE GIRL (Jan 2005),
 BLOODHANDS (Aug 2005) 
 GRANNY VAMPIRE (Aug 2006)

Sampradaya Dance Creations, Toronto
 VIVARTA (Mar 2005)
 SHOONYA
 PRALAYA

North West Dance Alliance, Manchester.
 DEVI DIVA (July 2005)

Threeaksha, Philadelphia, USA
 ABHIKA (2005-2006)
 PRAYOG (2007)
 NATYA SHASTRA (2018)

Performances
Rao has performed at national and international festivals including Pattadakal Festival, Navaraspur Festival, Lord Mayor's Cultural Event 1994 (Birmingham), World Veerashaiva Conference 1997 (U.S.A.), World Konkani Conference 2002 (Texas), Soorya Festival, and Nishagandhi Festival. He has toured India and abroad performing and conducting workshops.

Other activities
He is the founder of event management NGO Prakruthi that works towards a greener India by bringing people out of hibernation into  parks. Prakruthi increases awareness about Kannada literature and the culture of Karnataka through music. The Prakruthi Team organizes musical programs all over the state.

Recognition

 Aryabhatta Award - 1998
 Aryabhatta Award - 2000
 Aryabhatta Award - 2010
 Swaramandara Award (Hombale) - 1998
 Swaramandara Award (Hombale) - 2000
 G.V. Athri Award (Upasana) - 2000
 Silicon Jaycees Award - 2003
 Best music director award for Guptagamini, an Etv Kannada serial
 'Kalāvatamsa' title by Gokulam - 2010
 Colors Kannada Best Music Director for 'Chitte Hejje' - 2014
 Colors Kannada Best Music Director for 'Love Lavike' - 2016
 'Sangeetha Ratnakara' title by Shivapriya School of Dance - 2019
 'Natya Sangeetha Saraswathi' title by Natyasaraswathi Kuchipudi Dance Centre, Vijayawada - 2019
 Ananya Nritya Puraskar by Ananya Cultural Academy, Bangalore - 2019
 'Shree Kala Jyothi' by the Bangalore Gayana Samaja - 2021
 'Kala Chakravarthi' title by Shivapriya School of Dance - 2022
 'Karnataka Kalashri' State award and title by Sangeetha Nritya Academy - 2022

Other Works
As a composer, Rao created a style of his own. He has scored theatre, ballet, film and television productions. Rao scored the music to Sri M. S. Sathyu's short film Namak Ki Kankari (1996). As an arranger, he is known for fusing Hindustani music, Carnatic music with western techniques and arranged background scores for various films. He worked with theatre personalities including Sri A. S. Murthy, Sri B. V. Karanth and B. Jayashri etc. Rao has been involved in theatre in various capabilities. He has worked as a musician, composer, actor and director. He has acted in quite a few soap operas on television including Asare, Tulasi, Manvantara and Muktha.

He was commissioned by SAMPAD, UK to compose music for Moving Earth, a dance and music production that was part of the 2012 London Olympics.

He toured as a part of Chakrafonics, a world music band that addresses genres from Indian classical fusion to world music. Chakrafonics toured the US, UK and Australia (2014-2015).

References

External links 
 
 
 Praveen D. Rao at Music India
 Reality show
 
 
 
 
 
 

Year of birth missing (living people)
Living people
Musicians from Bangalore
Kannada-language lyricists
Kannada film score composers